Christopher Joyce may refer to:

 Christopher Joyce (hurler), Irish hurler
 Chris Joyce (born 1957), English drummer
 Chris Joyce (footballer), English footballer